Kujang County is a kun, or county, in southeastern North P'yŏngan province, North Korea. It was created in 1952 from part of Nyŏngbyŏn county, as part of a nationwide reorganization of local government. It borders Nyŏngbyŏn on the west, Hyangsan and Unsan counties on the north, Nyŏngwŏn on the east, and Kaech'ŏn and Tŏkch'ŏn cities to the south.

Geography
The Myohyang Mountains stretch across the eastern part of Kujang. The highest point is Kalbong (칼봉, 1530 m) in the north. The Ch'ŏngch'ŏn River flows through the centre of the county, and the Kuryong River flows along its western flank. Due to the mountainous terrain, only 17% of the county's land is cultivated, while 74% is occupied by forestland.

Administrative divisions 
Kujang county is divided into 1 ŭp (town), 5 rodongjagu (workers' districts) and 22 ri (villages):

Climate
The average annual temperature is 8.4 °C, with a January mean of -10.4 °C and an August mean of 24.2 °C. The average annual rainfall is 1300 mm, making for a comparatively cool and wet climate.

Economy
Zinc, coal, and mica are mined in the district. Factories produce cement and rail cars.

In 2019, the Kujang Youth No.1 Hydropower station opened. Prior to opening, the generator room was flooded, although the generators were not yet installed at that time. Kujang Youth No.2 Hydropower station is under construction.

Transportation
The Manp'o, P'yŏngdŏk and Ch'ŏngnyŏn P'arwŏn lines of the Korean State Railway intersect in Kujang, along with various branch lines serving the county's mines. There is also a road grid.

See also
Geography of North Korea
Administrative divisions of North Korea

References

Bibliography

External links

Counties of North Pyongan